The Wartburg 353, known in some export markets as the Wartburg Knight, is a medium-sized family car, produced by the East German car manufacturer AWE for their Wartburg brand. It was the successor of the Wartburg 311, and was itself succeeded by the Wartburg 1.3.

The Wartburg 353 was produced from 1966 to 1988, becoming the Wartburg with the longest production run. During its lifetime it saw several changes and improvements, the most recognizable of these coming in 1985 with a front facelift (as pictured here), slightly different layout around the engine block and a new carburettor.

Design
First introduced in June 1966, the Wartburg 353 was the creation of the former German BMW production facilities (called EMW under Soviet occupation). Its origins were ultimately derived from a 1938 DKW design, and powered by a two-stroke engine with only seven major moving parts: three pistons, three connecting rods and a crankshaft. This led to a common aphorism among Wartburg owners that "one drives a car, but only has to maintain a motorcycle."

Domestically, it was used for all types of government transportation, sometimes as a Volkspolizei police car. However, due to the nature of the planned economy, deliveries to private owners could take ten to fifteen years.

Like other Eastern European cars, it was known for its low price. Because of its forward centre of gravity and front-wheel drive, the car had typical front-wheel-drive road handling, usually displaying significant understeer, especially in wet conditions.

Wartburgs were exported to most European markets and South Africa.

Engine and transmission
 
The Wartburg 353 was powered by a 1-litre displacement, 3-cylinder unit that took almost two decades to refine. The transmission was equipped with a freewheel, obviating the need to use the clutch between gears. Designed as a fuel efficiency measure and as means of protecting the engine from oil starvation due to the nature of 2-strokes, the device disabled engine braking; the car was able to coast whenever the throttle was released. Drivers had the option of turning the freewheel off through a switch under the steering column to benefit from engine braking, useful since the front brakes were prone to overheating and fading. However, most drivers never disabled the freewheel, because it made shifting gears significantly easier and smoother, though not quicker. Earlier models had the gear stick on the steering column, although later versions had it on the floor.

It was available both with four- and five-speed transmissions, although the latter was very rare.

Popularity
The 353 was a reasonable success throughout the Eastern bloc, with front-wheel drive. Its negatives were all due to its outmoded two-stroke engine. However, in the Western European markets, the Wartburg was quite competitive especially because of its high maximum power of 58 hp at 5400rpm and top speed of 170km/h which is uncommon for passenger cars in the West, despite the two-stroke engine design.

The last modernization of Wartburg took place in 1988 when the car got the new designation "1.3" and a four-stroke VW designed engine with a 1.3 litre displacement. In 1991 Opel bought the plant.

Although the low price militated against the owners taking care of the car. Resale values were extremely low and in Finland, official figures on removals from the car register gave the Wartburg the shortest average life span of all listed manufacturers, this due to German reunification, the car ceased production in 1991, at nine years and three months.

The Wartburg 353 was commonly nicknamed "Trustworthy Hans" or "Farty Hans" by owners  due to its durability and copious exhaust emissions, especially when cold and/or overoiled. Noteworthy characteristics of the model are: simple design, dependability, occasional and cheap maintenance, strong chassis-based car frame, front-wheel drive, rear-wheel ABS regulator, a 525-litre trunk, innovative electronic gauges fitted after 1983. Disadvantages in terms of passengers' comfort are well known too: lack of any sound dampers led to significant engine feedback in the coupe which itself was in turn very boomy and reverberating, leading to another nickname, "The barrel". This left very few Wartburgs equipped with stereo because it was not possible to enjoy that at volumes most people do, over the engine noise. Suspension provided for sensibly different handling and comfort when the car was empty over when it was carrying passengers and luggage. Owners' accounts are that both control and smoothness went better the more the car was loaded.

It was also available as a pickup version named Wartburg 353 Trans, but was not very successful, mainly due to limited payload (only 450 kg) and low volume of transport. It was mainly used for small deliveries. This car was only sold in export, as it would have been useful mostly to the kinds of private business endeavors that were illegal in East Germany.

Wartburg owners' clubs exist throughout Europe and some Wartburgs are still used as rally racing cars.

Production
Over a million Wartburg 353s were produced overall.
Production figures (1966–1988):
 1966–1975 Wartburg 353, 356,330 
 1975–1988 Wartburg 353 W, 868,860

Model development
The transition model Wartburg 312, with the body of the Wartburg 311 and the underpinnings of the later Wartburg 353, appeared on September 1, 1965 with chassis number 65,533. From June 1, 1966, vehicles from VIN 1:30 001 received the new body, associated with a change in the type designation of "1000" to "353". A new transmission received since July 1, 1966, all vehicles from chassis number 001 02:14. The car entered the British market as the Wartburg Knight in early 1967, and a year later the estate "Tourist" model followed.

The introduction of the hatchback Wartburg Tourist with the VEB Karosseriewerke Halle (Saale) made body was carried in 1968. tailgate and rear fenders were made of glass fiber reinforced plastic manufactured. First, the Tourist was manufactured with a smooth C-pillar, in 1970 a forced ventilation system with air outlets in the C-pillar was introduced.

In 1970 ( exactly in 18-th June 1969- according to Mr. Horst Ihling's publication "Wartburg - Help Yourself" ) round instruments replaced the earlier "bathroom scale" type, and in 1972 bucket seats replaced the earlier types. Also in 1972, an optional floor shifter was introduced, but it did not function very well and saw limited sales. and Since 3 March 3, 1975 (from chassis number 10.06 948) the vehicle became the Wartburg 353 W. First shown in 1974, the 353 W received front disc brakes (of Czech manufacture) and many other safety changes such as rollbelts, a collapsible steering column, and dual circuit hydraulic brakes. The body remained unchanged.

From chassis number 17:20 932, on vehicles produced after 14 June 1982, the carburetor was switched to a Jikov 32 Sedr with pre-heated intake mixture (upgrading older models was not suggested), new brake drums rear and H4 headlights.

From 2 January 1984 the "S" version replaced the "de luxe," produced from chassis number 19:00 401. The model was characterized by matt black PVC door window frames, imitation leather trim and wood grain, trunk liner, fog lights (front and rear), two-tone horn, heated rear window and a Malimo corduroy interior. In addition, all models which until then had chromed body parts received black plastic powder coated ones. This was both a sign of shortage of raw materials in the East German economy and an attempt to keep up with the prevailing tastes.

As with the DKW, Wartburgs all had the radiator mounted behind the engine. This changed as of 30 June 1985 (from chassis number 20:24 100) as the radiator was moved to the usual position in front of the engine. The front clip was also redesigned and was now a one-piece body-coloured unit incorporating the grille opening. The previous bulged rectangle-shaped headlights were replaced with rectangular, slightly swept-back units.

Replacements

In 1968 the Wartburg 355, equipped with a 1.4-litre Renault engine, was developed but only six were built until the project was cancelled in 1973. The 355 had a modern three-dour coupé bodywork in GRP. T

In the mid-seventies, a joint project with Škoda and Trabant, led to the development of a Czech-engined design called the 610M. The plug was pulled on this project as the oil crisis had made it impossible to invest in the new plants that would be required. 

The Wartburg engineers developed several four-stroke versions, none of which were accepted for series production. In 1972 a four-stroke inline-four of 1.6 litres producing  was developed, but the political leadership cancelled the project in favor of a facelift. A slack in demand abroad was compensated for by rising demand within East Germany, made possible by wage increases. In the early eighties, as two-strokes were becoming harder and harder to sell, the technical team developed a four-stroke version of the 993 cc three-cylinder unit. In spite of good performance in tests, this too remained stillborn. 

It was not until 1984, when the license for producing Volkswagen's 1272 cc inline-four was gained that Wartburg had their chance. Deliveries of the Wartburg 1.3 finally begun in October 1988, much too late to help AWE survive the reunification.

Competition
The 353 was campaigned extensively, mostly as a rally car. For instance, a 353 driven by Niebergall and Froman finished tenth overall in the 1976 Acropolis Rally. Its best world championship rallying result was a second place in the 1973 Polish Rally, three hours behind the winner. Only one more car reached the finish.

In 1978 during November's RAC Rally, the final round of the World Rally Championship, all four Works Team Wartburg 353W entries of  Heimburger/Weitz, Hartwich/Wilss, Heitzmann/Fromman & Seltmann/Hoffmann completed the gruelling 715 km course over 3 days and nights. Seeded and numbered 80, 81, 105 and 104 of 168 original entrants, they took in all the classic narrow, snowy and icy gravel forest tracks of the UK. The Scottish Border country, the notorious Kielder Forest and then the Lake District, North Yorkshire. Next followed a whole day in the forests of both North and South Wales. The cars finished 37th, 44th, 53rd and 54th of 61 finishers. 107 entries of other marques had mechanical failure, crashed or retired. Second only in speed to Skoda of the "Eastern Bloc" entries, the Wartburgs proved formidably durable and reliable vehicles.  

The 353's last World Rally Championship result was at the 1993 1000 Lakes Rally, where Alpo Saastamoinen finished 53rd overall and fifth in class (A/5).

Model range

 Sedan, four-door
 Kombi, five-door ("Tourist") (Estate/Station wagon)
 Pickup, two-door ("Trans") (coupe utility)
 Prototypes / Special vehicles
 Wartburg 355 (Renault-engined prototype)
 Wartburg with gas turbines -drive
 Wartburg Rallye Trans (2 built)
 Wartburg 353 Rally Duo, one twin-engined prototype
 Wartburg 353 WR, Group B rally car
 Wartburg 353 W460, rally car
 CMEA car 610 M, developed together with Škoda
 Wartburg 360 (similar to the Audi 80 in appearance)
 Wartburg 400 (Kubel, Wartburg for NVA )
 Wartburg 760 (nicknamed the "pot-bellied pig", this was a projected collaboration with Škoda meant to replace the 353 as well as the Trabant and the Škoda 100)

Special editions

Ambulance

MED-ambulance emergency vehicle of the Red Cross of the GDR in the field of rapid medical aid (SMH), the urgent medical aid (DMH) and the urgent house call service (DHD) with a total of 100 vehicles, of which four were in the service of the National People's Army (NVA)

Melkus
Melkus RS1000 a sports car from Melkus developed from the Wartburg 353.

Gallery

Specifications: Wartburg 353

Specifications: Wartburg 353 WR

 Five-speed transmission with lockable freewheel
 reinforced closed box section frame, tuned coil springs with gas pressure shock absorbers, internally ventilated disc brakes, rear drum brakes, 6J13-cast magnesium wheels with 185/60 R13 tires
 Length , width , height , empty weight 
 Body parts, GFP fenders front and rear, GFP bumpers, GFP-bucket seats
 Safety roll cage, removable auxiliary lights, tachometer, sports belts

In popular culture
Serbian punk rock band Atheist Rap dedicated a song to Wartburg 353 on their debut album 'Maori i Crni Gonzales' from 1993, titled 'Wartburg Limuzina' ("Wartborg Limousine"), which reflects on the car's characteristics in a humorous but positive way. The song spawned a sequel on their second album 'Ja Eventualno Bih Ako Njega Eliminišete' from 1996, titled 'Car Core', about tuning a Wartburg, also in a humorous way. Both songs were made into music videos and remain among their greatest hits to this day.

See also
 Nissan Rasheen a very small and short 4WD that is often compared to Eastern European cars in design, particularly the Wartburg 353,

References

External links 
 UK-based official Wartburg, Trabant and IFA owners' club

353
Cars of Germany
1970s cars
1980s cars
Cars introduced in 1965
Front-wheel-drive vehicles
Sedans
Station wagons